Lari is a walled mountaintop frazione (hamlet) in the comune of Casciana Terme Lari in the Tuscany region of Italy. Its history dates from before the 8th century BC with strong references to Etruscan architecture.

Lari hosts the municipal seat of the comune.

The physician Eusebio Valli was born in Lari.

References

External links

 

Cities and towns in Tuscany
Frazioni of the Province of Pisa